Baron Mowbray is a title in the Peerage of England. It was created by writ for Roger de Mowbray in 1283. The title was united with the Barony of Segrave in 1368, when John Mowbray, 1st Earl of Nottingham and 5th Baron Mowbray, succeeded to that title. His successor was named Duke of Norfolk. With the childless death of Anne Mowbray, 8th Countess of Norfolk, in c.1481, the Barony went into abeyance between the Howard and Berkeley families, and both styled themselves Baron Mowbray and Seagrave.

In 1639, Henry Frederick Howard, later 22nd Earl of Arundel, was summoned to Parliament as Baron Mowbray, which by modern usage would have represented a novel peerage, but an 1877 House of Lords ruling viewed this as affirmation of the prior termination of the abeyance of the original title. The Mowbray barony held by the Howard family fell into abeyance in 1777 with the death of Edward Howard, 9th Duke of Norfolk.

In 1877 the senior co-heir, Alfred Stourton, Lord Stourton, petitioned the House of Lords to have the abeyance terminated in his favour, and though the original claim was for the resolution of the abeyance of the 1639 grant, a subsequently amended petition made a broader claim. A c.1484 royal letter in which John Howard, Duke of Norfolk, was given the assumed titles of Baron Mowbray and Seagrave was used as evidence that the abeyance of the 1283 peerage had been terminated in Howard's favour; there was no Berkeley representative in the hearing to point out that family had also used those assumed titles. The Committee for Privileges in the Mowbray-Seagrave Case ruled in Stourton's favour, and in 1878 the original Barony of Mowbray, and then two weeks later the associated Barony of Seagrave, were called out of abeyance in favour of Lord Stourton.

Thereafter, the Baronies of Mowbray and Seagrave were united with that of Stourton, and twice in the 20th century was briefly the premier barony of England when the only older title, the Barony of de Ros (created by writ in 1264), became abeyant before being called out of abeyance in favour of the senior co-heirs.

Barons Mowbray (1283)
Roger de Mowbray, 1st Baron Mowbray (d. 1297)
John de Mowbray, 2nd Baron Mowbray (d. 1322)
John de Mowbray, 3rd Baron Mowbray (1310–1361)
John de Mowbray, 4th Baron Mowbray (1340–1368)
John Mowbray, 1st Earl of Nottingham, 5th Baron Mowbray (1365–1379)
Thomas Mowbray, 1st Duke of Norfolk, 6th Baron Mowbray (1366–1399)
Thomas Mowbray, 4th Earl of Norfolk, 7th Baron Mowbray (1385–1405)
John Mowbray, 2nd Duke of Norfolk, 8th Baron Mowbray (1389–1432)
John Mowbray, 3rd Duke of Norfolk, 9th Baron Mowbray (1415–1461)
John Mowbray, 4th Duke of Norfolk, 10th Baron Mowbray (1444–1476)
Anne Mowbray, Duchess of Norfolk, 8th Countess of Norfolk, 11th Baroness Mowbray (1472-c.1481), in abeyance 1481
John Howard, 1st Duke of Norfolk, 12th Baron Mowbray (1420–1485), called out of abeyance c. 1484, forfeit 1485
Thomas Howard, 4th Duke of Norfolk, 13th Baron Mowbray (1538–1572), restored 1554, forfeit 1572
Thomas Howard, 21st Earl of Arundel, 14th Baron Mowbray (1585–1646), restored 1604
Henry Frederick Howard, 22nd Earl of Arundel, 15th Baron Mowbray (1608–1652), summoned to parliament as Lord Mowbray, 1639
Thomas Howard, 5th Duke of Norfolk, 16th Baron Mowbray (1627–1677)
Henry Howard, 6th Duke of Norfolk, 17th Baron Mowbray (1628–1684)
Henry Howard, 7th Duke of Norfolk, 18th Baron Mowbray (1654–1701), summoned to parliament as Lord Mowbray, 1678
Thomas Howard, 8th Duke of Norfolk, 19th Baron Mowbray (1683–1732)
Edward Howard, 9th Duke of Norfolk, 20th Baron Mowbray (1686–1777), abeyant 1777
Alfred Joseph Stourton, 21st/23rd Baron Mowbray (1829–1893) (Lords: Mowbray-Segrave Case 1877. Abeyance terminated 1878. Family Tree by Stephen Tucker College of Arms 1878)
Charles Botolph Joseph Stourton, 22nd/24th Baron Mowbray (1867–1936)
William Marmaduke Stourton, 23rd/25th Baron Mowbray (1895–1965)
Charles Edward Stourton, 24th/26th Baron Mowbray (1923–2006)
Edward William Stephen Stourton, 25th/27th Baron Mowbray (1953–2021)
James Charles Peter Stourton, 26th/28th Baron Mowbray (b. 1991)

The present Baron's four sisters are his co-heiresses presumptive.

References

Burke's Peerage

See also
Baron Segrave
Baron Stourton
Earl of Norfolk
Duke of Norfolk
Earl of Nottingham

Baronies in the Peerage of England
Baronies by writ
1283 establishments in England
Noble titles created in 1283